The 1920 Santo Domingo Census was conducted from 19 January to 24 December 1920, during the administration of the general Thomas Snowden, American governor of the Santo Domingo following the American occupation of the Dominican Republic.

This was the first census done in the land of the former Dominican Republic since the Spanish colonial period, although the Catholic Church had done several parish censuses; the 1920 census collected information regarding on sex, age, fertility, race, religion, marital status, nationality, and housing.

General results

See also 
 1950 Dominican Republic Census
 1960 Dominican Republic Census
 1970 Dominican Republic Census
 2010 Dominican Republic Census
 2022 Dominican Republic Census

Sources 
 Secretary of State of Home Affairs and Police (1923). First National Census of Population, 1920. University of Santo Domingo Publishing House.

Censuses in the Dominican Republic
1920s in the Dominican Republic
Santo Domingo